The Greenwich Country Day School is a co-educational, independent day school in Greenwich, Connecticut, United States, founded in 1926. As of 2019, it enrolled some 1190 students from nursery to 12th grade level. In November 2017, Greenwich Country Day acquired The Stanwich School, making it the only independent nursery through 12th grade co-educational school in Greenwich. The Head of School of GCDS is Adam Rohdie. The head of the high school is Chris Winters, former Greenwich High School principal.

It is accredited by the State of Connecticut through the New England Association of Schools and Colleges and is a member of the National Association of Independent Schools. The school is located on a rolling campus set into a series of hills. The Old Church Road campus is divided into three distinct schools, and the Upper School is on a separate campus on Stanwich Road. The two campuses are separated by less than two miles.

Notable alumni 
 Byrdie Bell, actress
 Neil Burger,  movie director
 George H. W. Bush, 41st President of the United States
 Hadley Delany, actress and model
 Theodore Forstmann, financier
 Bryce Dallas Howard,  actress, daughter of  director Ron Howard
 Stephanie McMahon, WWE personality, daughter of WWE founder Vince McMahon
 Donovan Mitchell, professional basketball player for the Cleveland Cavaliers
 Jen Psaki, Biden administration press secretary
 Helen Resor, Olympic hockey player
 Giovanni Reyna, professional soccer player
 Bill Simmons, former ESPN columnist, TV personality, New York Times best-selling author, and owner of The Ringer
 McLain Ward, Olympic equestrian show jumper
 Cameron Winklevoss, Olympic rower and social networking pioneer
 Tyler Winklevoss, Olympic rower and social networking pioneer

References

External links
Greenwich Country Day School

Private middle schools in Connecticut
Schools in Greenwich, Connecticut
Educational institutions established in 1926
Private elementary schools in Connecticut
1926 establishments in Connecticut